Solid! is an album by Eric Alexander, with John Hicks, George Mraz, and Idris Muhammad.

Background
"Anticipating Prestige's 50th anniversary in 1999, producer Todd Barkan combed the files to find out which were the label's most successful records and then, with Hicks, chose nine songs – not all of which are in the Prestige catalog, by the way – for this generation-spanning hard bop quartet to purvey."

Recording and music
The album was recorded at Clinton Recording Studios in New York City on April 25 and May 1, 1998. The four main musicians are tenor saxophonist Eric Alexander, pianist John Hicks, bassist George Mraz, and drummer Idris Muhammad. Trumpeter Jim Rotondi plays on "Little Melonae" and "Straight Street"; vibraphonist Joe Locke substitutes for Alexander on "Fire Waltz". "Light Blue" is played by Hicks alone.

Release and reception

Solid! was released by Milestone Records in 1998. The Penguin Guide to Jazz stated that "Alexander's sound is again tremendous; some of his most precocious solos, vaulting into double-time, are enough to have one reaching for the repeat button". The AllMusic reviewer concluded: "Nothing startling here, but fans of uncompromising modern hard bop will definitely enjoy this."

Track listing
"Solid"
"Little Melonae"
"Theme for Ernie"
"Fire Waltz"
"Four"
"Star-Crossed Lovers"
"My Conception"
"Light Blue"
"Straight Street"

Personnel
Eric Alexander – tenor saxophone
John Hicks – piano
George Mraz – bass
Idris Muhammad – drums
Jim Rotondi – trumpet (tracks 2, 9)
Joe Locke – vibraphone (track 4)

References

1998 albums
Eric Alexander (jazz saxophonist) albums